Val-David is a village of more than 5,200 inhabitants in the Laurentian Mountains about  north of Montreal, Quebec, Canada. Attracting about 100,000 tourists a year, Val-David is predominantly francophone although it has a small anglophone minority.

The village is famous for its delicious and diverse food scene as well for its artistic and hippie character. Many renowned and amateur artists, writers and dancers live and have lived in Val-David, notably Québécois poet Gaston Miron, jazz bassist Charlie Biddle, and singer-songwriter Alan Gerber.

Val-David is also a centre for much outdoor recreational activity as its  Parc Dufresne is the most popular rock-climbing destination in eastern Canada. Also, the Parc Linéaire Le P'tit Train du Nord, a  bike trail, and groomed cross-country ski and snowshoe trails in Winter, run throughout the town's splendid nature.

History

The place was first known as Belisle's Mills, after the owner of one of the area's first sawmills. In 1873, its post office opened under the name of Mont-Morin, which was renamed Belisle's Mills in 1901. In 1917, the parish of Saint-Jean-Baptiste-de-Belisle or Bélisle was formed, detached from Sainte-Agathe-des-Monts. In 1921, the village municipality was officially established and named after the parish.

In 1923, the post office was renamed Val-David, which also became the official designation of the municipality in 1944. It pays tribute to Louis Athanase David (1882-1953), member of parliament for Terrebonne from 1916 to 1919 and secretary of Quebec from 1919 to 1936, and his father Laurent-Olivier David (1840-1926), member of the House of Commons and author of several books.

It now has its first local community monthly newspaper, ski-se-dit.

Transportation
The town is accessible via Autoroute 15 which links Laval and Montreal towards the south shore suburbs like Brossard and the north shore suburbs like Saint-Jérôme. The autoroute 15 also offers a direct path to and from the United States border. The municipality is located near the northern terminus of the Autoroute which continues further north via Route 117 towards the La Vérendrye Wildlife Reserve north of Mont-Tremblant and Mont-Laurier.

Demographics 

Mother tongue:
 English as first language: 4.2%
 French as first language: 89.5%
 English and French as first language: 1.8%
 Other as first language: 3.7%

Education
Val-David has three schools (all francophone), one of which is the Waldorf school, which is very popular among some of the hippie folk because of their approach to education.

Sainte Agathe Academy (of the Sir Wilfrid Laurier School Board) in Sainte-Agathe-des-Monts serves English-speaking students in this community for both elementary and secondary levels.

References

External links

 Official website in English
 1001 POTS in Val-David

Villages in Quebec
Designated places in Quebec
Incorporated places in Laurentides
Climbing areas of Quebec